Leptopholcus is a genus of cellar spiders that was first described by Eugène Louis Simon in 1893.

Species
 it contains twenty-two species, found only in Africa and Asia:
Leptopholcus borneensis Deeleman-Reinhold, 1986 – Thailand, Indonesia (Borneo, Lesser Sunda Is.)
Leptopholcus budongo Huber, 2011 – Congo, Kenya, Uganda
Leptopholcus debakkeri Huber, 2011 – Congo
Leptopholcus dioscoridis Deeleman-Reinhold & van Harten, 2001 – Yemen (Socotra)
Leptopholcus dschang Huber, 2011 – Cameroon
Leptopholcus gabonicus Huber, 2014 – Gabon
Leptopholcus gracilis Berland, 1920 – Somalia, Kenya, Tanzania, Mozambique, South Africa
Leptopholcus griswoldi Huber, 2011 – Madagascar
Leptopholcus guineensis Millot, 1941 – West Africa
Leptopholcus gurnahi Huber, 2011 – Tanzania
Leptopholcus huongson Huber, 2011 – China, Thailand, Vietnam
Leptopholcus kandy Huber, 2011 – India, Sri Lanka
Leptopholcus kintampo Huber & Kwapong, 2013 – Ghana
Leptopholcus lokobe Huber, 2011 – Madagascar
Leptopholcus ngazidja Huber, 2011 – Madagascar, Comoros
Leptopholcus obo Huber, 2011 – São Tomé and Príncipe
Leptopholcus podophthalmus (Simon, 1893) – Sri Lanka to China, Singapore
Leptopholcus sakalavensis Millot, 1946 – Madagascar
Leptopholcus signifer Simon, 1893 (type) – Angola, Kenya
Leptopholcus talatakely Huber, 2011 – Madagascar
Leptopholcus tanikawai Irie, 1999 – Japan, China
Leptopholcus tipula (Simon, 1907) – West and Central Africa

See also
 List of Pholcidae species

References

Araneomorphae genera
Pholcidae
Spiders of Africa
Spiders of Asia